Hellmann's and Best Foods are American brand names that are used for the same line of mayonnaise, ketchup, mustard, sauce, salad dressing, condiments and other food products. They have been owned by the British multinational company Unilever since 2000. The Hellmann's brand is sold in the United States east of the Rocky Mountains; Latin America; Europe; Australia; the Middle East; Canada; India; and Pakistan. The Best Foods brand is sold in the United States west of the Rocky Mountains; in East Asia; Southeast Asia; Australia, and New Zealand.

Hellmann's and Best Foods are marketed in a similar way. Their logos and websites resemble one another, and they have the same English slogan: "Bring out the best".

Both brands were previously sold by the U.S.-based Bestfoods Corporation, which also sold several other food products in addition to Hellmann's and Best Foods mayonnaise. Bestfoods, known as CPC international before 1997, was acquired by Unilever in 2000.

History
In 1903, Richard Hellmann (1876-1971) emigrated from Vetschau, Prussia, to New York City, where in August 1904, he married Margaret Vossberg, whose parents owned a delicatessen. In mid-1905, he opened his own delicatessen at 490 Columbus Avenue, where he developed his first ready-made mayonnaise, dished out in small amounts to customers. It became so popular that he began selling it in bulk to other stores, constantly improving the recipe to make it avoid spoilage longer.

In 1913, after continued success, he built a factory to produce his mayonnaise in even greater quantities, and began selling it on September 1 under the name Hellmann's Blue Ribbon Mayonnaise, seeing sales greatly increase after switching from hotel-size large stone jars to customer-size clear glass jars that could be reused for home canning after selling them a rubber ring for 1 penny.

In May 1914, he simplified the label from three ribbons to a single blue ribbon, and trademarked it along with the name "Blue Ribbon Mayonnaise". In 1915, he sold his store and opened a small mayonnaise factory at 120 Lawrence Street (now West 126th) in Manhattan; by the end of the year, he had a larger factory at 495/497 Steinway Street in Long Island City. In February 1916, the company was incorporated as Richard Hellmann, Inc., after which he briefly tried other products, such as horseradish and pumpernickel bread, before deciding to concentrate on mayonnaise and expand distribution outside the New York area. In November 1919, he licensed John Behrmann to make the mayonnaise in Chicago.

In 1920, the New York Tribune asked three chefs to rate commercial salad dressing brands, and they voted Hellmann's mayonnaise the best, noting that it had more oil (85%) than any other salad dressing they tested. This helped to boost sales.

On July 29, 1920, Hellmann became a U.S. citizen; later that year, Margaret Hellmann died, and on May 11, 1922, he married second wife Nina Maxwell, daughter of Mr. and Mrs. William J. Maxwell.

In 1922, after sales of the mayonnaise were launched in Toronto, Ontario, Canada, Hellmann began building a larger (5-story) factory at 34-08 Northern Boulevard in Long Island City. While honeymooning in San Francisco, California, Hellmann decided to open a plant there too, setting up an office and soliciting salesmen. In 1922 the Hellmann's mayonnaise cookbook was published by Behrman in Chicago.

While Hellmann's Mayonnaise thrived on the U.S. East Coast, selling $15 million a year by 1927 with $1 million in profits, the California company Postum Foods (later Best Foods) introduced their own mayonnaise, Best Foods Mayonnaise, which became popular on the West Coast, and was operating a major plant in San Francisco. In August 1927 Postum Foods bought the Hellmann's brand, allowing Hellmann to retire. By then both brands of mayonnaise had such commanding market shares in their respective halves of the country that the company decided that both brands and recipes be preserved in their respective territories.

To this day:
 Best Foods Mayonnaise is sold west of the Rocky Mountains, specifically, in and west of Montana, Wyoming, Colorado, and New Mexico, as well as Colby and Goodland, Kansas. 
 Hellmann's is sold east of the Rockies, specifically, in and east of the states of North Dakota, South Dakota, Nebraska, Kansas, Oklahoma, parts of Colorado and Texas.

In 1955, Best Foods acquired Rosefield Packing Co., makers of Skippy peanut butter. In 1958 Best Foods was bought by Corn Products Refining Company to form Corn Products Company, which in 1969 became CPC International Inc. Hellmann's mayonnaise arrived in the United Kingdom in 1961 and by the late 1980s had over 50% market share.

Before 1960, Hellmann's and Best Foods were advertised in the same advertisement, which pointed out that it is known as Hellmann's in the East and Best Foods in the West. Around 1968 the Best Foods brand added the Blue Ribbon from the Hellmann's brand, making them more like sister products. Since 2007, both brands have exactly the same design.

In 1997, CPC International renamed itself Bestfoods, focusing in packaged food products (including the Hellmann's brand), and spun-off the corn-refining business into a new company called Corn Product International, currently known as Ingredion. Bestfoods was acquired by Unilever in 2000.

On February 1, 2023, Hellmann's was discontinued in South Africa.

Recipe and marketing issues

When Best Foods acquired the Hellmann's brand, it decided to keep the respective recipes for both mayonnaises. However, at least as recently as June 2003, the recipes were almost identical. From the company's FAQs at the time:
"The products are basically the same. Both trademarks evolved simultaneously – Hellmann's in the East and Best Foods in the West. Taste preferences vary; some people find that Best Foods mayonnaise is slightly more tangy."

Today, the two products are made in the same plant. Both labels contain the same ingredients in the same 'relative quantity' order: soybean oil, water, whole eggs & egg yolks, vinegar, salt, sugar, lemon juice, sorbic acid, calcium disodium EDTA, and natural flavors. Best Foods' may contain more lemon juice, though the ingredients, ordered by volume, are the same as Hellmann's. Still, the fine print in the company's marketing and websites state that "Hellmann's is known as Best Foods west of the Rockies" and "Best Foods is known as Hellmann's east of the Rockies"

Maintaining the separation of brands in the USA poses some unique challenges. Marketing campaigns for both products are identical; however, Hellmann's and Best Foods must make separate television commercials for each product and cannot make use of nationwide media to market their product, though each brand can use a different ad, where a Hellmann's ad airs on a national television network's Eastern/Central feed, while the Best Foods ad is carried on a Mountain/Pacific feed.

See also
 German inventors and discoverers
 List of mayonnaises

References

External links

Unilever Website

Unilever brands
Unilever companies
Products introduced in 1913
Food brands of the United Kingdom
Brand name condiments
Mayonnaise
2000 mergers and acquisitions